5899 Jedicke, provisional designation , is a binary Hungaria asteroid approximately 3 kilometers in diameter. It was discovered on 9 January 1986, by American astronomer Carolyn Shoemaker at Palomar Observatory, and named after the members of the Canadian Jedicke family.

Classification and orbit 

Jedicke is a bright E-type asteroid and member of the Hungaria family, which form the innermost dense concentration of asteroids in the Solar System. It orbits the Sun in the inner main-belt at a distance of 1.7–2.2 AU once every 2 years and 8 months (978 days). Its orbit has an eccentricity of 0.12 and an inclination of 24° with respect to the ecliptic.

Physical characteristics

Primary 

According to the survey carried out by NASA's Wide-field Infrared Survey Explorer with its subsequent NEOWISE mission, Jedicke ("primary") measures 2.672 kilometers in diameter and its surface has a very high albedo of 0.621. The Collaborative Asteroid Lightcurve Link assumes an albedo of 0.30 – a compromise value between 0.4 and 0.2, corresponding to the Hungaria asteroids both as family and orbital group – and calculates a diameter of 3.51 kilometers with an absolute magnitude of 14.2.

Between February 2010, and April 2016, astronomer Brian Warner obtained several rotational lightcurves of Jedicke from photometric observations at his Palmer Divide Station in Colorado, United States. Best rated lightcurve analysis from March 2013, gave a refined rotation period of 2.7481 hours with a brightness amplitude of 0.11 magnitude, superseding a preliminary estimate of 3–4 hours. However, an alternative period of 3.076 hours was found again in 2015, without any plausible explanation for a sudden 0.03 hour slowing, that apparently took place between 2011 and 2012.

Moon 

During Brian Warner's initial photometric observation in February 2010 – carried out in collaboration with mentor Alan W. Harris at the Space Science Institute in La Canada, California, Petr Pravec at Ondřejov Observatory in the Czech Republic, and Joseph T. Pollock at Appalachian State University, North Carolina – it was revealed that Jedicke is a synchronous binary system with a minor-planet moon orbiting it every 16.7 hours.

Based on the observed mutual eclipse/occultation events, the satellite diameter measures at least 32% of that of Jedicke (i.e. a secondary-to-primary mean-diameter ratio of ≥ 0.32), which translates into a diameter of 0.8–1.1 kilometers, depending on the underling size estimate of its primary. The "Johnstonsarchive" estimates that the moon has a semi-major axis of 4.4 kilometers.

Naming 

This minor planet was named for the Canadian Jedicke family, notably Peter Jedicke (born 1955), Robert Jedicke (born 1963), and June Jedicke-Zehr (born 1966). Peter is a retired teacher of astronomy and physics at Fanshawe College, President of the Royal Astronomical Society of Canada, and one of Canada's best known amateur astronomers. Robert is a physicist and participant in the Spacewatch survey, who discovered the Jupiter-family comets 179P/Jedicke (P/1995 A1) and 269P/Jedicke (P/1996 A1). June Zehr has often shared observing sessions with her two brothers.

Name suggested and citation prepared by Canadian astronomer David H. Levy. The approved naming citation was published by the Minor Planet Center on 12 July 1995.

References

External links 
 Peter Jedicke's Home Page 
 Peter Jedicke, WMPG – Meteor Physics Group, University of Western Ontario
 Lightcurve plot of 5899 Jedicke, Palmer Divide Observatory, B. D. Warner (2010)
 Asteroids with Satellites, Robert Johnston, johnstonsarchive.net
 Asteroid Lightcurve Database (LCDB), query form (info )
 Dictionary of Minor Planet Names, Google books
 Asteroids and comets rotation curves, CdR – Observatoire de Genève, Raoul Behrend
 Discovery Circumstances: Numbered Minor Planets (1)-(5000) – Minor Planet Center
 
 

005899
Discoveries by Carolyn S. Shoemaker
Discoveries by Eugene Merle Shoemaker
Named minor planets
005899
19860109